The Pictave is an endangered French breed of bantam chicken. It is named for the Pictavi, the tribe which gave its name to the former Province of Poitou, now part of the region of Nouvelle-Aquitaine. It is a true bantam, and has no full-sized counterpart; it is the only true bantam of France.

History 

From about 1900 these were selectively bred by Raymond Lecointre at Anché, to the south of Poitiers in the département of the Vienne. He used the hens to incubate his pheasant eggs and raise the chicks. A standard for the breed was drawn up in 1928, and approved in 1929.

The Pictave came close to extinction in the years after the Second World War. There were attempts to rescue it by cross-breeding with other bantam breeds. Care was taken to avoid consanguinity, but the poor understanding of genetics of the time meant that the breed deviated from the original pre-War standard. The Bantam Club of France published its first book of standards in 1985; the Pictave was well described, but the illustration did not conform precisely to the standard. This deviation was recognised at the conference of Châtellerault in 1998, and a new breeding objective was established: to return to the 1928 standard.

The Pictave is rare. It was listed as "endangered" by the FAO in 2007. In 2014 there were 50 fertile hens.

Characteristics 

The Pictave has a long tail, long wings which are carried low, and a rounded breast.

A single colour, partridge, is recognised for the breed. The legs are pinkish-white and four-toed, the comb, earlobes and wattles red.

Use 

Pictave hens are lay about 130 creamy-white eggs per year; the eggs should weigh at least . The hens are excellent sitters and good mothers.

Pictave hens have been used in the Nord-Pas-de-Calais region (now part of Hauts-de-France) to help in re-introduction of partridge.

References

Bantam chicken breeds
Chicken breeds
Chicken breeds originating in France